Kosovo has 13 grades

Universities are moving to bachelor's and master's degrees.

The academies use the normal grading system.

AL1: 90-100
AL2: 85-89
AL3: 80-84
AL4: 75-79
AL5: 65-74
AL6: 45-64
AL7: 20-44
AL8: 0-20

References

External links
 Kosovo Academic Services https://web.archive.org/web/20101223171018/http://kas-ks.org/kas2/index.php

Grading